Christos Eleftheriadis (born 30 September 1991) is a Greek professional footballer who plays as a forward for Super League club Ionikos.

Honours
PAS Giannina
 Super League Greece 2: 2019–20

References

1991 births
Living people
Greek footballers
Super League Greece players
Football League (Greece) players
Super League Greece 2 players
Kavala F.C. players
Pierikos F.C. players
Almopos Aridea F.C. players
Niki Volos F.C. players
Panachaiki F.C. players
PAS Giannina F.C. players
PAS Lamia 1964 players
Ionikos F.C. players
Association football forwards
Footballers from Kavala